1963 Théâtre des Capucines is the fourth live album by Serge Gainsbourg (the first recorded chronologically), released in 2009, featuring a 1963 concert at the Théâtre des Capucines, Paris. It features the same type of minimalist jazz arrangement as his 1963 album, Gainsbourg Confidentiel; the 2001 re-release of which actually featured this album in its entirety as bonus tracks.

Track listing 
 "Présentation de Serge Gainsbourg" - 0:26
 "Les Femmes des uns sous les corps des autres" - 2:26
 "Intoxicated Man" - 1:45
 "La Recette de l'amour fou" - 1:50
 "Ce mortel ennui" - 2:12
 "La Javanaise" - 2:22
 "Maxim's" - 1:26
 "Negative Blues" - 1:47
 "L'Amour à la papa" - 2:16
 "Dieu, que les hommes sont méchantes" - 1:57
 "Personne" - 2:56

Personnel 
 Claude Dejacques - artistic production
 Serge Gainsbourg - vocals
 Elek Bacsik - electric guitar
 Michel Gaudry - double bass

References 

2009 live albums
Serge Gainsbourg albums
Universal Records albums